Pramod Ranjan Choudhury (1904 – 28 September 1926) was a Bengali activist for the Indian independence movement who was hanged for the assassination of police officer Bhupen Chatterjee.

Early life
Pramod Ranjan was born at Kelishahar, Chittagong District in British India. His father's name was Ishan Chandra Choudhury.

Revolutionary activities
Choudhury joined the Anushilan Samiti group at Chattogram. In 1921 he took part in the non-cooperation movement. He was arrested at Dakshineswar for his connections with the Dakshineswar Conspiracy Case and sent to prison. On 28 May 1926 Choudhury and other fellow revolutionary inmates killed Bhupen Chatterjee with an iron rod. Chatterjee was a deputy superintendent of the Police Intelligence Branch who spied on inmates and tried to destroy the mental strength of political prisoners.

Death
The trial of the killers began on 15 June 1926 and a sentence of capital punishment was handed down on 21 June. Choudhury and Anantahari Mitra were hanged on 28 September 1926 in the Alipore Central Jail in Kolkata.

References 

1904 births
1926 deaths
Executed revolutionaries
Revolutionary movement for Indian independence
Indian nationalism
Indian revolutionaries
Executed Indian people
20th-century executions by the United Kingdom
People executed by British India by hanging
Prisoners and detainees of British India
People executed for murdering police officers
Indian independence activists from West Bengal